Socket FMx may refer to:

 Socket FM1
 Socket FM2
 Socket FM2+